The 2017–18 Mid-American Conference women's basketball season began with practices in October 2017, followed by the start of the 2017–18 NCAA Division I women's basketball season in November. Conference play began in January 2018 and concluded in March 2018. Central Michigan won its second straight regular season title with a record of 17–1 by one game over Buffalo. Tinara Moore of Central Michigan was named MAC player of the year.

Top-seeded Central Michigan won the MAC tournament by beating Buffalo 96–91 in the final. Buffalo was given an at large bid as the 11th seed in the Albany Region of the NCAA tournament where they scored wins over #19 South Florida 101–79 and #11 Florida State 86–65 before losing to second seeded #7 South Carolina in the Sweet Sixteen. Central Michigan also reached the Sweet Sixteen in the Spokane Region after defeating #24 LSU 78–69 and #10 Ohio State 95–78. They were knocked out by #6 Oregon. Ball State, Miami, and Toledo all qualified for the WNIT.

Preseason awards
The preseason coaches' poll and league awards were announced by the league office on October 25, 2017.

Preseason women's basketball coaches poll
(First place votes in parenthesis)

East Division
 Buffalo (10) 69
 Kent State (1) 52
 Ohio (1) 47
 Miami 40
 Bowling Green 23
 Akron 21

West Division
 Central Michigan (10) 70
 Toledo (1) 60
 Ball State (1) 46
 Western Michigan 32
 Northern Illinois 29
 Eastern Michigan 15

Regular Season Champion
Central Michigan (10), Ball State (1), Buffalo (1)

Tournament champs
Central Michigan (9), Ball State (1), Buffalo (1), Western Michigan (1)

Honors

Postseason

Mid–American tournament

NCAA tournament

Women's National Invitational Tournament

Postseason awards

Coach of the Year: Sue Guevara, Central Michigan
Player of the Year: Tinara Moore, Central Michigan 
Freshman of the Year: Cece Hooks, Ohio
Defensive Player of the Year: Tinara Moore, Central Michigan
Sixth Man of the Year: Oshlynn Brown, Ball State

Honors

See also
 2017–18 Mid-American Conference men's basketball season

References